Loch Spynie is a small loch located between the towns of Elgin and Lossiemouth in Moray, Scotland. Close to Spynie Palace, the ancient home of the bishops of Moray, it is an important wildlife habitat which is protected as a Ramsar Site.

History

Loch Spynie is a remnant of a great wetland that stretched from the western shore of the current loch to the mouth of the River Lossie and, at that time, many of the settlements along the Moray coast were actually islands in the Moray Firth. The connections this area had to the sea silted up over the centuries but the Laich of Moray was still navigable in the middle ages. In the mid 19th century the Spynie Canal was constructed by Thomas Telford to drain the Laich of Moray for farmland. Artificial shores were built on the western and northern sides of the loch which was kept for wildfowling and fishing. Wildfowling has stopped altogether since 1981 and the amount of angling has been negligible since that year too.

In 1679 Janet Grant was convicted of stealing linen from a weaver in Gordonstoun, and taking and breaking open his money chest. She was sentenced to be drowned in Loch Spynie by the Barony Court of Gordonstoun.

Natural history
Loch Spynie is a naturally eutrophic loch with extensive reedbeds surrounding the open water. It is one of the few Scottish localities for alder swamp woodland, and has an unusual aquatic community including the nationally scarce slenderleaf pondweed. Loch Spynie regularly supports internationally important numbers of roosting greylag geese, with up to 5% of the Iceland population over-wintering at the site. Breeding birds here include grey heron, common tern, black-headed gull, water rail and little grebe, the gulls and terns nesting on artificial rafts. Osprey fish here in the Spring and Summer when marsh harriers may also be seen. In addition to the greylags, whooper swan, wigeon, teal, goldeneye and tufted duck arrive in the Autumn some wintering. Other wildlife includes red squirrel, otter, common frog and common toad.

As well as being recognised as a wetland of international importance under the Ramsar Convention,  Loch Spynie has been designated a Special Protection Area and Site of Special Scientific Interest. The RSPB has provided a bird hide and feeders which can be reached from the car park. The RSPB manage the loch and its environs as a nature reserve.

References

Bibliography
 
 

Ramsar sites in Scotland
Sites of Special Scientific Interest in Scotland
Wetlands of Scotland